A.C. Beatie House is a historic home located near Chilhowie, Smyth County, Virginia. It was built in 1891, and is a two-story, frame Queen Anne style dwelling.  It features a cornice with molded gable returns and scroll-sawn profile brackets, a polygonal front bay, and a one-story, three-bay porch with intricately scroll-sawn columns, cornice brackets, and balustrade.  Also on the property are the contributing poured concrete dairy, a frame smokehouse constructed above an underground root cellar, a frame shed used to store coal and wood, a shed-roofed chicken coop, a frame garden house / garage, a garage, and a frame machinery shed. Also located on the property are the ruins of Town House, composed of three stone chimneys and brick wall remnants of a summer kitchen.

It was listed on the National Register of Historic Places in 2001.

References

Houses on the National Register of Historic Places in Virginia
Queen Anne architecture in Virginia
Houses completed in 1891
Houses in Smyth County, Virginia
National Register of Historic Places in Smyth County, Virginia